Syeda Jebunnesa Haque (born 1 February 1944) is a Bangladesh Awami League politician. She served as a Jatiya Sangsad member representing the Reserved Women's Seat–35 during 2009–2014.

Haque was awarded Begum Rokeya Padak by the Government of Bangladesh in 2012.

Attack
On 24 December 2004, a grenade attack was launched at the residence of Haque, the then president of District Mohila Awami League, while a meeting of the committee was being conducted. The house was in Sylhet City's Tantipara area. Eight leaders and activists were injured.

Personal life
Haque is married to Enamul Haque, also a leader of the district Awami League.

References

Living people
1944 births
Awami League politicians
Women members of the Jatiya Sangsad
21st-century Bangladeshi women politicians
9th Jatiya Sangsad members
Recipients of Begum Rokeya Padak
Place of birth missing (living people)
7th Jatiya Sangsad members
20th-century Bangladeshi women politicians